Vivathana Milinthachinda (5 February 1923 – 2003) was a Thai footballer. He competed in the men's tournament at the 1956 Summer Olympics.

References

External links
 

1923 births
2003 deaths
Vivathana Milinthachinda
Vivathana Milinthachinda
Vivathana Milinthachinda
Footballers at the 1956 Summer Olympics
Place of birth missing
Association footballers not categorized by position